Miss International 1992, the 32nd Miss International pageant, was held on October 18, 1992 in Sasebo, Nagasaki, Japan. Kirsten Davidson earned Australia's third Miss International crown.

Results

Placements

Contestants

  - Gisela Manida Demarchi
  - Kirsten Marise Davison
  - Karin Friedl
  - Véronique Jacqueline De Roe
  - Ana Paola Roca Mercado
  - Cynthia de Cunto Moreira
  - Joanne Elizabeth Lewis
  - Lara Corwen Thornton
  - Lina Maria Marin Díaz
  - Marisol Soto Alarcón
  - Stepanka Tycova
  - Stine Cecilie Hansen
  - Giselle del Carmen Abreu
  - Maria Elena Ferreiro
  - Tiina Johanna Salmesvirta
  - Benedicte Marie Delmas
  - Meike Schwarz
  - Georgia Drosou
  - Lisa Marie Martin
  - Narcy Maricela Pérez Hernández
  - Susan Elizabeth Shaw
  - Linda Grandia
  - Francis Funes Padilla
  - Shirley Cheung Suet-Ling
  - Thorunn Larusdóttir
  - Komal Sandhu
  - Mary Catherine Moore
  - Sarit Afangar
  - Nicole Cinquetti
  - Tomoko Nishiki
  - Yum Jung-ah
  - Carole Reding
  - Carol Sophie Cutajar
  - María de los Angeles López
  - Robina Whittaker
  - Christina Vincoy Borja
  - Rita Omvik
  - Lizbeth del Carmen Achurra
  - Joanne Timothea Barbiera Alivio
  - Elzbieta Jadwiga Dziech
  - Dayanara Torres Delgado
  - Dia Nathalie Aissatou
  - Li Li Goh
  - Samantha Torres Waldrón
  - Camilla Ingeborg Unsgaard
  - Sandra Anita Steffen
  - Pornnapha Theptinnakorn
  - Banu Nur Dipcin
  - Sandra Lee Allen
  - Maria Eugenia Rodríguez Noguera

Notes

Did not compete
  - Susana Alves da Silva

References

1992
1992 in Japan
1992 beauty pageants
Beauty pageants in Japan